Abdelouahed Souhail ( - born 1946, Casablanca) is a Moroccan politician of the Party of Progress and Socialism. Since 3 January 2012, he holds the position of Minister of Employment and Vocational Training in  Abdelilah Benkirane's government. On 9 February 1998, he was appointed by King Hassan II as the CEO of the CIH Bank, a position he held until 2004.

See also
Cabinet of Morocco

References

External links
Ministry of Employment

Living people
Government ministers of Morocco
1946 births
Party of Progress and Socialism politicians
People from Casablanca
Moroccan bankers
Moroccan chief executives